Frederick Burns may refer to:
 Frederick William Burns, American sports announcer
 J. Frederick Burns, American politician from Maine
 Fred Burns (Frederick D. Burns), American sportswriter, and tennis commentator and player

See also
 Fred Burns (actor), American actor 
 Freddie Burns, English rugby union player